Roman Gutwinski (alternative spelling: Roman Gutwiński, 1860–1932) was a phycologist.

Works 
 Prodromus florae algarum galiciensis. 1895
 De algis a Dre M. Raciborski anno 1899 in insula Java collectis. 1902
 Flora algarum montiium Tatrensium... 1909

References 

 Roman Gutwinski at elipinki.pl (Polish)

1860 births
1932 deaths
Phycologists